Flanagan Hotel may refer to:

 Hotel Senator (Saskatoon), formerly Flanagan Hotel, Saskatoon, Saskatchewan, Canada
 Flanagan Hotel (New York), Malone, New York